Spindel is a surname. Notable people with the surname include:

Bernard Spindel (1923–1971), American surveillance expert
David Spindel (born 1941), American photographer
Hal Spindel (1913–2002), American baseball player
Janis Spindel, American entrepreneur

See also
Spindle (disambiguation)